Robert, Rob, Robbie, Bob or Bobby Henderson may refer to:

Sports
Robert Henderson (Welsh cricketer) (1865–1931), Welsh cricketer
Robert Henderson (Middlesex cricketer) (1851–1895), English cricketer
Robert Henderson (footballer), English footballer
Bob Henderson (Scottish footballer) (fl. 1929–1932), Scottish footballer (Burnley FC, New Brighton)
Bobby Henderson (footballer) (1917–2006), Scottish footballer (Partick Thistle, Dundee FC)
Bob Henderson (Australian footballer) (1934–2019), Australian rules footballer for Fitzroy
Rob Henderson (born 1972), English and Irish rugby union footballer
Robbie Henderson (born 1982), Scottish footballer
Robert Henderson (American football) (born 1983), American football defensive end
Robert Henderson (speedway rider), Swedish motorcycle speedway rider, see 2010 Individual Ice Racing World Championship

Politics and military
Robert Henderson (Royal Navy officer) (1778–1843), French Revolutionary and Napoleonic Wars
Robert Johnson Henderson (1822–1891), Confederate States Army colonel
Robert Henderson (British politician) (1876–1932), British Member of Parliament
Robert James Henderson (1877–1953), member of Canadian Parliament
Robert Henderson (Canadian politician) (born 1961), Canadian politician in the Legislative Assembly of Prince Edward Island
Robert Henderson (American politician), member of the Iowa House of Representatives

Writers, artists and entertainers
Robert Henderson (actor) (1904–1985), American actor
Bobby Henderson (musician) (1910–1969), American jazz pianist
Robert Henderson (writer) (born 1947), English political writer

Other people
Robert Henderson (mathematician) (1871–1942), Canadian-American mathematician and actuary
Robert Henderson (physician) (1858–1924), British physician
Robert W. Henderson (zoologist)
Robert G. Henderson, sound editor
Bobby Henderson (activist) (born 1980), creator of the Church of the Flying Spaghetti Monster
Robert Henderson (River City), fictional character in Scottish soap opera
Robert Dale Henderson (1945–1993), American serial killer

See also
Bert Henderson (disambiguation)
Robert Henryson (fl. c. 1460–1500), Scottish poet
Henderson (surname)